Donja Mahala is a village in the municipality of Orašje, Bosnia and Herzegovina.

Demographics 
In the 1991 census it had a population of 4,273.

According to the 2013 census, its population was 3,702.

References

Populated places in Orašje